Wan Chunbo (born 13 January 1973) is a Chinese speed skater. He competed in the men's 1500 metres event at the 1998 Winter Olympics.

References

1973 births
Living people
Chinese male speed skaters
Olympic speed skaters of China
Speed skaters at the 1998 Winter Olympics
Place of birth missing (living people)
Speed skaters at the 1996 Asian Winter Games
Speed skaters at the 1999 Asian Winter Games
20th-century Chinese people